Thomas Conway (February 27, 1735 – c. 1800) served as a major general in the American Continental Army during the American Revolutionary War. He became involved with the alleged Conway Cabal with Horatio Gates. He later served with Émigré forces during the French Revolutionary Wars.

Early life
Conway was born in County Kerry, Ireland to James Conway and his wife Julieanne Conway. Though born to a Catholic family, it is unclear how closely he adhered to the faith. As a child, he immigrated to France with his parents. At 14, he enrolled in the Irish Brigade of the French Army and rose rapidly to colonel by 1772.

Arrival in America
Following the outbreak of the American Revolutionary War he volunteered to the Congress to service with the American rebels in 1777. Based on an introduction from Silas Deane, the Congress appointed him a brigadier general on May 13, and sent him on to George Washington.

Conway commanded the leading brigade on the American right flank at the Battle of Germantown, and was justly praised for his actions. However, Washington opposed his promotion to major general, believing that many American-born officers with longer and valuable service deserved the rank; this caused a falling out between Washington and Conway. Congress appointed Conway a major general despite Washington's objections in December 1777, and made him Inspector General of the army.

Conway Cabal

When his name was used politically, it was used to describe the infighting known as the Conway Cabal. During the affair, he had written  a letter to General Horatio Gates in which he referred to Washington as a "weak general," criticizing General Washington's failed tactics against British General William Howe. The letter stated: "Heaven has been determined to save your country; or a weak general [George Washington] and bad counselors would have ruined it." The letter was intercepted by Washington and his backers after its delivery was botched by Brigadier General James Wilkinson, and brought before the Congress for inquiry. When the contents of the letter were made public, Conway lost his command as a result. He tried a ploy that had worked before his promotion, and submitted his resignation to Congress in March 1778. This time it was accepted, so he was forced to leave the continental army. John Cadwalader shot him in a duel on July 4, 1778. When he recovered, he wrote an apology to Washington and returned to France.

There is also a slightly different version of these happenings:

Later life
Conway later returned to the French Army, in 1787 he received promotion to Maréchal-de-camp (Major General) and an appointment as Governor of French colonies in India.

In 1793 he fought with royalist forces in opposition to French Revolution in southern France.
  
During the French Revolution he was condemned to death. He was saved only by an appeal to Great Britain (against which he had fought in the American Revolution), but was compelled to flee from France for his life.

After that Conway disappeared from history. He had a wife and daughter, and is supposed to have died about 1800.

References

1735 births
1800 deaths
18th-century Irish people
Continental Army generals
American duellists
Irish soldiers in the French Army
French Army officers
Irish emigrants to France
Governors of French India
Inspectors General of the United States Army
French military personnel of the American Revolutionary War
Continental Army officers from Ireland